Mazenod College is an independent Roman Catholic single-sex secondary day and boarding school for boys, located in the eastern  suburb of Lesmurdie, Western Australia. It is one of three schools run by the Oblates of Mary Immaculate (OMI) and the only OMI school in Western Australia.

Notable alumni 

 Daniel BandyAustralian rules footballer with the Fremantle and Western Bulldogs Football Clubs.
 John Bestallhockey and Olympian.
 Luke BlackwellAustralian rules footballer with the Carlton Football Club, 2011 Sandover Medallist.
 Dean Capobianco200-metre runner & 1990 Stawell Gift winner.
 Chris Collins - known by stage name Hannah Conda, a drag performer most known for competing on the second season of RuPaul's Drag Race Down Under where they placed runner up.
 Scott CummingsAustralian rules footballer with the Essendon, West Coast Eagles, Collingwood and Port Adelaide Football Clubs.
 Luke EnglishAustralian rules footballer with the Richmond Football Club.
 Corey GaultAustralian rules footballer with the Collingwood Football Club.
 Paul HaslebyAustralian rules footballer with the Fremantle Football Club.
 Matt KeoghFederal Member for Burt.
 David Smythactor and writer, known as 'The iiNet Guy'.
 Harry EdwardsAustralian rules footballer with the West Coast Eagles.

See also 

 List of schools in the Perth metropolitan area
 List of boarding schools in Australia

References

External links 
 Mazenod College's website
 Mazenod College Old Boys' website

Catholic boarding schools in Australia
Catholic secondary schools in Perth, Western Australia
Boarding schools in Western Australia
Boys' schools in Western Australia
Educational institutions established in 1966
1966 establishments in Australia
Lesmurdie, Western Australia